Milan Marković (born 20 May 1979) is a Serbian football defender.

References

External links
 

1979 births
Living people
Sportspeople from Niš
Association football defenders
Serbian footballers
FK Radnički Niš players
OFK Niš players
FK Sileks players
FK Sinđelić Niš players
Serbian SuperLiga players